The 2022 World Weightlifting Championships was a weightlifting competition held in Bogotá, Colombia in December 2022. It was scheduled to be held in Chongqing, China but this changed in March 2022 as a result of COVID-19 measures in China. The new location was announced in April 2022. It was the first time Colombia hosted the World Weightlifting Championships.

The event served as a qualification event for the 2024 Summer Olympics in Paris, France. Weightlifters from Russia and Belarus did not compete after a ban as a result of the Russian invasion of Ukraine. North Korea also did not compete after the International Weightlifting Federation (IWF) tightened its rules on anti-doping controls.

The IWF considered using two platforms instead of one at the competition but the venue proved to be unsuitable. During the competition, an increase in the number of no lift results was attributed by competitors and staff to the city's altitude above sea level with weightlifters experiencing difficulty in taking in enough oxygen.

Schedule

Medal summary

Men

Women

Medal table
Ranking by Big (Total result) medals

Ranking by all medals: Big (Total result) and Small (Snatch and Clean & Jerk)

Team ranking

Men

Women

Participating nations
A total of 537 competitors from 93 nations participated.

 (1)
 (4)
 (2)
 (12)
 (6)
 (2)
 (2)
 (2)
 (2)
 (1)
 (2)
 (7)
 (9)
 (3)
 (17)
 (20)
 (13)
 (20)
 (2)
 (4)
 (4)
 (5)
 (6)
 (7)
 (16)
 (6)
 (1)
 (1)
 (1)
 (5)
 (4)
 (10)
 (6)
 (1)
 (10)
 (3)
 (1)
 (2)
 (4)
 (2)
 (5)
 (12)
 (11)
 (3)
 (6)
 (7)
 (18)
 (13)
 (3)
 (2)
 (5)
 (2)
 (2)
 (6)
 (1)
 (3)
 (1)
 (20)
 (2)
 (5)
 (1)
 (3)
 (3)
 (1)
 (4)
 (2)
 (2)
 (3)
 (5)
 (9)
 (3)
 (7)
 (1)
 (6)
 (1)
 (5)
 (18)
 (12)
 (4)
 (1)
 (1)
 (13)
 (2)
 (1)
 (8)
 (5)
 (20)
 (10)
 (13)
 (7)

References

External links
Results
Results book

 
World Weightlifting Championships
World Championships
Weightlifting Championships
International weightlifting competitions hosted by Colombia
Sports competitions in Bogotá
World Weightlifting Championships
Weightlifting